Fritz William Michel (born 1980) is a Haitian politician who was nominated for Prime Minister of Haiti on 22 July 2019, but was not confirmed as such by parliament. 

He was previously the Chief Accountant at the Ministry of the Economy and Finance from 2009 to 2011.

References

21st-century Haitian politicians
Living people
1980 births
People from Port-au-Prince
State University of Haiti alumni